Premier Lacrosse League (PLL), also known as Premier Lacrosse League Powered by Ticketmaster, is an American professional field lacrosse league. The league's inaugural season debuted on June 1, 2019, and included a 14-week tour-based schedule taking place in 12 major-market cities.

NBC Sports (2019–2022) 
In October 2018, the PLL and NBC jointly announced that the NBC Sports Group got exclusive rights to broadcast the league's 14-week season on its broadcast and cable networks, including 10 regular-season weekends, an All-Star weekend and two playoff weekends concluding with the title game on September 21. More specifically, NBC's broadcast network would air three PLL games, with NBCSN airing 16 more and the other 20 available through an NBC Sports Gold package. 

In May 2019, NBC announced that pre-game, halftime, and postgame host Paul Burmeister, play-by-play voice Brendan Burke, and analyst Ryan Boyle would be their first-ever commentators during the PLL's inaugural season. Joining them would be Chantel McCabe, who would serve as a reporter at various times throughout the season. 

Production innovations that NBC would bring included in-game player-to-commentator communication, SMT Shot Speed tracking technology, Skycam on multiple games, miked-up players and coaches — and the use of players as commentators throughout the season. As for player-to-commentator communication, this means that the two players on the field, focusing on the goalie and attack positions, would be able to communicate with the NBC Sports PLL broadcast team. Meanwhile, NBC Sports installed an array of sensors at each end of the field for each PLL game to track shot speed from a variety of angles, using SMT's lacrosse intelligence engine to provide real-time speed tracking. 

On May 6, 2020, the PLL announced a two-week quarantined and fanless tournament called the PLL Championship Series to be scheduled to run from July 25-August 9. All 20 of the league's games would be presented live across NBC, NBCSN, or NBC Sports Gold, with all televised games also streaming live on NBCSports.com and the NBC Sports app.

ESPN and The Walt Disney Company (2022-present)
On March 23, 2022, the Premier Lacrosse League reached a 4-year media rights agreement with ESPN and The Walt Disney Company, which will see ESPN carry every game, including the league’s All-Star festivities, Playoff games, and Championship Weekend, exclusively across ESPN, ESPN2, ESPN+, and ABC.

See also
Sports_broadcasting_contracts_in_the_United_States#Premier_Lacrosse_League
Major League Lacrosse on television
National Lacrosse League on television

References

External links
NBC Sports - Lacrosse
NBC Sports Gold Premier Lacrosse League Pass

 
NBC Sports
ABC Sports
ESPN
Lacrosse on television